Nina Berman (born 1960) is an American documentary photographer, filmmaker, author and educator. Her wide-ranging work looks at American politics, militarism, environmental contamination and post violence trauma. Berman is the author of three monographs: Purple Hearts – Back From Iraq; Homeland; and An autobiography of Miss Wish.

Her photographs and videos have been exhibited in the Brooklyn Museum, Dublin Contemporary 2011 and the 2010 Whitney Museum of American Art Biennial. She is the recipient of a New York Foundation for the Arts grant, several photojournalism awards, including two World Press Photo awards and a Hasselblad award.

Early life and education
Berman was born in New York City. She received an A.B. from the University of Chicago and a M.S. from the Columbia University Graduate School of Journalism.

Work
She is a member of the NOOR photo agency and an associate professor at Columbia University. She is a former teacher at the International Center of Photography in New York City.

In 2005, Berman received the first Open Society Institute documentary distribution grant and traveled to high schools around the USA with Army veteran Robert Acosta presenting and exhibiting the Purple Hearts project. Her work with high school students continued in 2010 in collaboration with the Whitney Museum of American Art as an artist in residence with the museum's Youth Insights program. In 2011, Berman developed a high school art curriculum with the Whitney Museum of American Art based on her images of wounded American veterans from the Iraq War and her Homeland series. In 2009, Berman became a member of the NOOR photo agency based in Amsterdam. In 2012, she became an associate professor at the Columbia University Graduate School of Journalism.

Publications

Monographs
 Purple Hearts – Back from Iraq. London: Trolley, 2004.
 Homeland. London: Trolley, 2008.
 An autobiography of Miss Wish. Heidelberg, Germany: Kehrer, 2017.

Catalogues/books
 Crimes of War: What the Public Should Know, Roy Gutman, David Rieff, Norton, 1999.
 Humans Being: Disability in Contemporary Art, Chicago Cultural Center, Chicago, 2006.
 War Stories, Massachusetts College of Art and Design, Boston, 2008.
 The Pursuit of Happiness, Stitching Fotografie, Noorderlicht, 2009.
 A History of Women Photographers, Naomi Rosenblum, Abbeville Press Publishers, New York, 2010.
 A New American Photographic Dream: US Today After, Gilles Verneret, Silvana Editoriale, Milan, 2010.
 Whitney Biennial 2010, Whitney Museum of American Art, New York, 2010.
 Disquieting Images, Germano Celant /Melissa Harris, Skira, Milan, 2011.
 Ugliness: A Reconsideration, I.B. Tauris, London, 2012.
 Photographs Not Taken, Will Steacy, Daylight Books, 2012.
 Making History, RAY Fotografieprojekte, Frankfurt, 2012.
 Bosnia - 1992-1995, Jon Jones and Gary Knight, Sarajevo, 2012.
 War/Photography: Images of Armed Conflict and its Aftermath, Anne Wilkes Tucker, MFAH, USA, 2012.
 Photojournalists on War: The Untold Stories from Iraq, Mike Kamber, University of Texas, 2013.
 Trolleyology, Gigi Giannuzzi/Hannah Watson, Trolley, London, 2013.

Exhibitions
 2005: Purple Hearts at Moving Walls, Open Society Institute, New York City
 2007: Jen Bekman Gallery, New York City
 2008: Visa Pour L'Image, Perpignan, France
 2008: War Stories, Massachusetts College of Art, Boston
 2009: Gage Gallery, Roosevelt University, Chicago
 2009: War Ltd, Purple Hearts, Dubrovnik, Croatia
 2010: US Today After, IUFM Confluences, Lyon, France
 2010: Biennial 2010, Whitney Museum of American Art, New York City
 2010: Disquieting Images, Milano Triennale Milan, Italy
 2011: Noorderlicht Photo Festival, Metropolis, Groningen, The Netherlands
 2011: Gemak Museum, Generation 9-11 The Hague, The Netherlands
 2011: Changes, Halle 14, Leipzig, Germany
 2011: Dublin Contemporary 2011, Dublin, Ireland
 2012: Howard Greenberg Gallery, New York in Color, New York, USA
 2012: Weatherspoon Art Museum, To What Purpose? Photography as Art and Document, Greensboro, USA
 2012: Helsinki Photography Biennial, Helsinki, Finland
 2012: Bronx Documentary Center, Bronx Gardens, Bronx, NY, USA
 2012: RAY 2012, Frankfurt, Germany
 2012: John Michael Kohler Arts Center, The Kids Are All Right, Sheboygan, Wisconsin, USA
 2012: Museum of Fine Arts, Houston, War/Photography: Images of Armed Conflict and Its Aftermath, Houston, USA
 2012: Honolulu Museum of Art, Courage and Strength, Honolulu, USA
 2012: Portland Art Museum, Flesh and Bone: Photography and the Body, Portland, OR, USA
 2013: Denver Month of Photography - Red Line Gallery, The Reality of Fiction, Denver, USA
 2013: Po Kim Art Gallery War is for the Living, New York City, USA
 2013: Annenberg Space for Photography, War/Photography: Images of Armed Conflict and Its Aftermath, Los Angeles, USA
 2013: Maison de la Photographie - Robert Doisneau, Solutions by NOOR', Gentilly, France
 2013: Corcoran Gallery of Art, War/Photography: Images of Armed Conflict and Its Aftermath, Washington D.C. USA
 2013: Center for Photography at Woodstock, Marcellus Shale Documentary Project, Woodstock, NY, USA
 2013: Noorderlicht, To Have and Have Not, Groningen, The Netherlands
 2013: Photoville Fractured: the Shale Play, Brooklyn, New York, USA
 2013: Zacheta National Gallery of Art, In God We Trust, Warsaw, Poland
 2013: Brooklyn Museum, War/Photography: Images of Armed Conflict and Its Aftermath, Brooklyn, NY USA
 2014: Manchester Art Gallery The Sensory War: 1914-2014, Manchester, UK
 2014: Palmer Art Museum, Marcellus Shale Documentary Project, State College, PA, USA
 2014: Le Musee des Beaux-Arts Putain de Guerre: 1914- 2014, Charleroi, Belgium
 2014: Portland Art Museum, Blue Sky at 40,'' Portland, Oregon, USA

Awards
 1987: Finalist, Livingston Award
 1993: Pictures of the Year Award
 1997: Pictures of the Year Award
 1998: Pictures of the Year Award
 1999: Pictures of the Year Award
 2004: Third Prize (with two others) (along with four others), Days Japan International Photojournalism Awards.
 2005: Open Society Institute Documentary Grant
 2005: World Press Photo award
 2006: New York Foundation for the Arts Fellowship
 2007: Pictures of the Year Award
 2007: World Press Photo award (for her portrait "Marine Wedding" of Tyler Ziegel, a wounded Marine, and his bride)
 2009: PDN Annual Book Award
 2009: Hasselblad Masters Award
 2014: The Josephine Herrick Project Annual Photographer Award
 2016: The Aftermath Project Grant Award
 2017: Susan E. Tifft fellow, Center for Documentary Studies, Duke University

References

External links
 

Living people
1960 births
American women photographers
Photographers from New York City
Documentary photographers
University of Chicago alumni
Columbia University Graduate School of Journalism alumni
Columbia University Graduate School of Journalism faculty
21st-century American women
Women photojournalists